This is a list of Turkmenistan magazines including those that are no longer published.

 Diýar 
 Garagum 
 Dünýä edebiýaty 
 Zenan kalby 
 Güneş 
 Wozroždeniýe - in Russian 
 Saglyk 
 Turkmenistan Sport  
 Türkmenistanyň lukmançylygy  
 Milli goşun 
 Serhetabat Döwletabat
 Oil, gas and mineral resources of Turkmenistan 
 Journal of the Ministry of Foreign Affairs of Turkmenistan  
 Construction and Architecture of Turkmenistan

See also

List of newspapers in Turkmenistan
Media of Turkmenistan

References

Links 
 Turkmen magazines at PDF

Lists of mass media in Turkmenistan
Turkmenistan